The Dave Rimington Trophy is awarded to the player considered to be the best center in college football. Dave Rimington was a center who played at the University of Nebraska from 1979 to 1982.

A member of the National College Football Awards Association, the Rimington Trophy serves as a fundraiser for the Boomer Esiason Foundation's fight against cystic fibrosis. In addition to recognizing the season's most outstanding center in college football, the Rimington Trophy also recognizes legendary centers from the past by presenting the President Gerald R. Ford Legendary Center Award. The award is presented annually to a former collegiate or professional center who was either a legend on the field or off the field by making extraordinary contributions through business, civic or philanthropic endeavors. The sculptor of the Dave Rimington Trophy is Marc Mellon, also the sculptor of the NBA MVP Trophy.

Selection process
The winner of the Rimington Trophy is selected by determining the consensus All-American center pick from four existing All-America Teams. While more than a dozen All-America football teams are selected annually, the Rimington Trophy committee uses these four prestigious teams to determine a winner:

•	American Football Coaches Association (AFCA) 
•	Walter Camp Foundation (WCF) 
•	The Sporting News (SN) 
•	Football Writers Association of America (FWAA)

Because the selectors of these four All-America teams can place centers in a "mix" of offensive linemen that includes guards and tackles, their 11-man first teams can often have two centers. The Rimington Trophy committee's policy is to count all players that play primarily the center position for their respective teams as centers, even though they may be listed as guards or tackles on the four All-American teams. The center with the most first-team votes will be determined the winner. If there is a tie with first-team votes, then the center with most second-team votes will win. If there is still a tie, the winner will be determined by a majority vote from the Rimington Trophy committee.

Winners

References
General
 
 
Footnotes

External links
 

College football national player awards
Awards established in 2000